Verizon Communications Inc. v. Federal Communications Commission, 535 U.S. 467 (2002), is a United States Supreme Court case in which Verizon Communications argued that the FCC had an unreasonable way for setting rates for leasing network elements. It held that the FCC can require state commissions to set the rates charged by incumbents for leased elements on a forward-looking basis untied to the incumbents' investment and that the FCC can require incumbents to combine elements of their networks at the request of entrants.

Background 
The Telecommunications Act of 1996 left the FCC freedom to define the standard for leasing rates with very few details. This led to Verizon questioning if the FCC is authorized to be able to require state utility commissions to set the rates charged by the incumbents for leased elements.

The court focused on three main issues, which were the FCC's pricing rules for these unbundled network elements, also whether the exclusion of historical costs in the pricing rules constitutes a governmental taking, and lastly, various rules for combining network elements. It focused primarily on the economic implications of the FCC's costing standards which the Court upheld and secondarily on the takings claim.

Telecommunications Act of 1996 
The Telecommunications Act of 1996 allows the FCC the ability to require state utility commissions to set rates charged by incumbent local exchange carriers for lease of network elements to competitive local exchange carriers on a forward-looking basis, untied to the incumbents' historical or past investments. The methodology of doing this by the FCC is not inconsistent with the act therefore is reasonable.
The Act contains unbundled access obligations of local exchange carriers:  The duty to provide, to any requesting telecommunications carrier for the provision of a telecommunications service, nondiscriminatory access to network elements on an unbundled basis at any technically feasible point on rates, terms, and conditions that are just, reasonable, and nondiscriminatory in accordance with the terms and conditions of the agreement and the requirements of this section and section 252. An incumbent local exchange carrier shall provide such unbundled network elements in a manner that allows requesting carriers to combine such elements in order to provide such telecommunications service.

Pricing network elements 
The Historical cost is the cost of using long-lived assets in any given period which depends on the original costs of assets. In the telecommunications industry these have the trend of dropping over time due to technological innovation and progress. This cost calculating method may then overstate the current long run marginal cost which is why, in contrast, the FCC uses a "forward-looking" cost, referred to as Total Long Run Incremental Cost, or TELRIC, which uses current replacement costs instead of the original cost in its methodology.

Under the Telecommunications Act, Bell Operating Companies, which includes Verizon, have the incentive to unbundle their elements. If conditions are met, elements that are unbundled need not be offered at TELRIC and prices only need to avoid being "unjust, unreasonable, or unreasonably discriminatory." Enough interconnection, unbundling and resale agreements with the companies can foster competition.

Opinion of the Court

Arguments 
The case was decided in an opinion written by Justice David Souter. The Respondent, the Federal Communications Commission (FCC), received six out of eight votes with Justices Stephen Breyer and Antonin Scalia dissenting.

In the certiorari from the Supreme Court to the Appeal court they state, “In order to foster competition between monopolistic carriers providing local telephone service and companies seeking to enter local markets provisions of the Telecommunications Act of 1996 entitle the new entrants to lease elements of the incumbent carriers local-exchange networks”. In five separate cases they argued over the FCC's regulations though ultimately the Court of Appeals held that the use of the TELRIC methodology was foreclosed because the Act plainly required rates based on the actual cost of providing the network element and invalidated certain combination rules.

Majority opinion

Dissenting opinion

Subsequent developments 

The following are other press releases by Verizon that relate to the case decision.
 Feb. 19, 2003: Verizon claims that "rather than bringing stability, certainty and clarity to the regulatory structure for the industry, the commission left a void and handed off the decision-making to the states. This is a recipe for continued disarray in the industry and more litigation."
 Feb. 23, 2003: "Verizon Chief Executive Officer Ivan Seidenberg today told financial analysts that the FCC's policies are flawed both legally and as a sustainable business model for creating competition."

In the news 

In 2010 Verizon Wireless launched its latest advertising campaign creating the new tagline "Rule The Air." The campaign boasts Verizon's superior ability in its 4G network to "send a strong signal."
While Verizon Wireless would like to "rule the air," as this ads suggest, the carrier, along with AT&T, must instead share the air, ruled by the Federal Communications Commission ... to create data-roaming agreements, ensuring all Americans have access to mobile e-mail and Internet services.

Relevant cases 
Verizon Communications v. Law Offices of Curtis V. Trinko, LLP
 The Sherman Antitrust Act and requirements of telecommunications companies under the Telecommunications Act of 1996

Consumer.net and Russ Smith v. Verizon et al.
 The FCC found only one violation of the Commission's rules and the Communications Act. This violation related to the failure of Verizon New Jersey to record a company-specific DNCL request made by Smith in September 2003. The rest of the complaints were dismissed.

Four cases included in the same certiorari where parties challenged FCC regulations are:
 WorldCom, Inc., et al. v. Verizon Communications Inc. et al.
 Federal Communications Commission et al. v. Iowa Utilities Board et al.
 AT&T v. Iowa Utilities Board
 General Communications, Inc. v. Iowa Utilities Board et al.

Law reviews 
 Entry Policy in Local Telecommunications: Iowa Utilities and Verizon
This article draws on the Supreme Court decision in Verizon to argue that the intersection of ambiguous telecommunication access statues and the limits on judicial review as a result of the separation of powers and the application of Chevron U. S. A. Inc. v. Natural Resources Defense Council, Inc., mean that administrative law has become an ineffective tool in ensuring the accountability of telecommunications regulators…This article argues for Congress to address pricing in greater detail. 
 Verizon Communications, Inc. v. FCC: Telecommunications Access Pricing and Regulator Accountability through Administrative Law and Takings Jurisprudence
Similarly, while we think the Court made some missteps in the Iowa Utilities and Verizon, overall the Court’s analysis in both of these cases strikes us as reasonable and likely even right. The economic issues at the core of these cases were complicated and at times ambiguous, and the Court in out view exercised good judgment in deciding when to wade into the morass and when to defer to technical issues to the Commission. Out purpose of this article, then, is not to criticize either the Commission of the Court. Instead we, we set out her to move the analysis forward…

See also 
 Sprint Communications, Inc. v. Jacobs

Notes

External links 
 
 Verizon website - Verizon's Homepage
 FCC website - FCC's Homepage

United States Supreme Court cases
United States Supreme Court cases of the Rehnquist Court
2002 in United States case law
Verizon Communications litigation
Federal Communications Commission litigation